Forbairt Naíonraí Teoranta (FNT, English: Pre-school Development Foundation) was a voluntary organisation that worked to encourage the development of Irish language childcare and education services throughout Ireland. They were based in Dublin, Ireland. Forbairt Naíonraí Teoranta and funded by Foras na Gaeilge' and the Department of Children and Youth Affairs.

History
Forbairt Naíonraí Teoranta was founded in 2003 by Na Naíonraí Gaelacha and Bord na Gaeilge (now Foras na Gaeilge), to act as a successor to An Comhchoiste Réamhscolaíochta, which was set up in 1978. While An Comhchoiste looked after the country as a whole, FNTs consisted of all areas outside the Gaeltacht, with Comhar Naíonraí na Gaeltachta' operating in the Gaeltacht regions.

FNT provided advice and support to anyone wishing to use Irish with children. Its main focus was the foundation and development of childcare and education services through the medium of Irish. It provided particular support and training in order to establish, develop and run the following services through Irish: naíonraí (pre-schools), naíolanna (crèches), parent/guardian and toddler groups, after school services and summer camps. In addition to providing advice and specific training courses, they also assisted in the provision of insurance and distribute grants to existing naíonraí.

FNT also ran courses, through the medium of Irish, for those working in naíonraí. The main courses they provided were an Intensive Training Course and FETAC Childcare Level 5 and 6.

References

External links 
 Forbairt Naíonraí Teoranta

Child care skills organizations
Organisations based in Dublin (city)
Organizations established in 2003